The New Zealand Business Hall of Fame is a figurative hall of fame dedicated to New Zealanders who have made a significant contribution to the economic and social development of New Zealand. The hall was established in 1994 by the Young Enterprise Trust. Laureates are selected by an independent panel and are inducted at an annual gala dinner.

Laureates
The following is a complete list of laureates of the New Zealand Business Hall of Fame, up to inductions on 18 August 2022.

References

Awards established in 1994
Business
Business Hall of Fame